The Clinton School is a New York City public middle and high school located in the Chelsea section of Manhattan, New York. It serves a student body of about 400 students between the 6th and 12th grades. The Clinton School is authorized by the International Baccalaureate Organization to offer the IB Diploma Programme. As per the U.S. News 2018 High School Ranking, the Clinton School is one of the top high schools in the nation,. Applicants must succeed in an admission test, and satisfy other requirements according to the grade entered. For over twenty years Clinton was located on the top floor of the elementary school PS 11 but has now relocated to a new building near Union Square.

As of the 2017-18 school year, the high school had an enrollment of 488 students and 34 classroom teachers (on an FTE basis), for a student–teacher ratio of 14.4:1. There were 51 students (12% of enrollment) eligible for free lunch or reduced-cost lunch.

Academic rigor 
Inside Schools has praised the school's rigor, noting that
"The academic load is intense, but students get lots of support. Eighth-graders take high school math and science courses to complete two of the five Regent’s exams required for graduation, and they complete the rest of their Regent’s by the end of 10th grade."

International Baccalaureate Diploma Program (IBDP) 
The Clinton School offers the IB diploma in the twelfth grades, with challenging courses offered from grades nine to twelve as preparation.

References

External links 

 

International Baccalaureate schools in New York (state)
Public middle schools in Manhattan
Public high schools in Manhattan
Chelsea, Manhattan